Jeickson Gustavo Reyes Aparcana (born October 9, 1987 in Lima, Peru) is a Peruvian footballer who plays as a left back for Escuela Municipal Deportivo Binacional.

Club career
Jeickson Reyes started his playing career with Alianza Lima, playing on their youth teams. He debuted in the Torneo Descentralizado on December 15, 2004 playing for Deportivo Wanka when he was 17 years old.

Reyes returned to Alianza Lima for the 2005 Torneo Descentralizado season and stayed with them until the end of the 2006 season. At the beginning of 2007, he played for Deportivo La Unión, a team in the Copa Perú division. He once again returned to Alianza Lima for the second half of the 2007 season, where he managed to make only two league appearances. The following 2008 season he managed to play in 14 league matches for the Blanquiazules.

In January 2009, he joined Sporting Cristal for the start of the 2009 season.

International career
Reyes was part of the Peru under-20 team in the 2007 South American Youth Championship

References

External links

1987 births
Living people
Footballers from Lima
Peruvian footballers
Club Deportivo Wanka footballers
Club Alianza Lima footballers
Sporting Cristal footballers
Club Deportivo Universidad César Vallejo footballers
Juan Aurich footballers
Peruvian Primera División players
Copa Perú players
Association football fullbacks
Deportivo Binacional FC players